High Contrast Confidential is the fourth album and the second double album from the Welsh drum and bass producer High Contrast, released on 27 April 2009 on the Hospital Records label. It is an assortment of handpicked songs he has written in the past. The first disc includes a premium selection of singles from his previous three albums but the second disc includes some of his remixes from the past.

The Album Art contains aspects of High Contrast's previous albums. The backdrop is the same as True Colours, he has the suit and cocktail from High Society and the phone pictured on the cover of Tough Guys Don't Dance is lying on the floor.

Track listing

Disc 1 - The Originals 
 "Racing Green"
 "Return of Forever"
 "If We Ever"
 "Seven Notes In Black"
 "Kiss Kiss Bang Bang"
 "Twilights Last Gleaming"
 "Tread Softly"
 "Lovesick"
 "Music Is Everything"
 "The Persistence Of Memory"
 "Basement Track"
 "When The Lights Go Down"

Disc 2 - The Remixes 
 Adele - "Hometown Glory"
 The Streets - "Has It Come To This?"
 High Contrast - "The Basement Track" (HC's Upstairs Downstairs Remix)
 Omni Trio - "Renegade Snares"
 Eric Prydz - "Pjanoo"
 London Elektricity - "Remember The Future"
 Utah Saints - "Something Good 08"
 Ils - "No Soul"
 Missy Elliott - "We Run This"
 Blaze - "Most Precious Love"
 Blue Sonix - "This Feeling"
 Basement Jaxx - "Hey U"
 London Elektricity - "My Dreams"

Certifications

Release history

References

External links 
 Hospital Records: Record Label Info on the Release
 Allmusic: [ Confidential]

High Contrast albums
2009 compilation albums
2009 remix albums
Hospital Records albums